Adam's Woman is a 1970 Australian-American historical drama film directed by Philip Leacock and starring Beau Bridges, Jane Merrow and John Mills. It has been called a "convict Western".

Plot
In the 1840s, an American sailor ashore in Liverpool is wrongly convicted and sent to the penal colony in Sydney, Australia where he enters into a battle of wills with the Governor. The Governor offers him a pardon if he helps pioneer new land for the growing colony. He marries Irish woman Bess and they establish a farm despite the harassment of bushrangers.

Opponents of the governor persuade a visiting Crown commissioner, Lord Croydon, to revoke Adam's pardon. Adam tries to escape but is arrested. Bess pleads his case and Adam gets a full pardon.

Cast
 Beau Bridges – Adam Beecher
 Jane Merrow – Bess
 John Mills – Sir Philip MacDonald
 James Booth – Dyson
 Andrew Keir – O'Shea
 Tracy Reed – Duchess
 Peter O'Shaughnessy – Barrett
 John Warwick Croyden
 Harry Lawrence – Muir
 Katy Wild – Millie
 Mark McManus – Nobby
 Harold Hopkins – Cosh
 Doreen Warburton – Anne
 Clarissa Kaye-Mason – Matron
 Peter Collingwood – Chaplain

Production
The film was originally known as The Return of the Boomerang. It was announced in November 1965 as part of a four film slate by Motion Pictures International, a new company formed by Steve Broidy and Louis F. Edelman. In June 1966 it was reported that Lowell Barrington, author of the novel Return of the Boomerang had been signed by Broidy to write the script for Edelman, with filming to begin in the Australian summer.

In March 1967 Broidy said the film would be one of five he would make that year the others being The Fox, God's High Table, Ignatz and The Coasts of War. In April Edelman said that Lewis Allen would direct from a script by T. E. B. Clarke with filming to begin in October.

In February 1968 Eldeman announced that Philip Leacock would direct the film from a script by Clarke. The following month it was reported Richard Fielding was writing the script for Edelman with filming to begin "this fall".

By November 1968 the project was being made for Warners-Seven Arts and Beau Bridges, Jane Merrow, James Booth and John Mills were cast. The film was given a three-month schedule in Australia. In December Chips Rafferty was listed among the cast (but he does not appear in the final film.)

The film was titled Adam's Woman in December 1969.

Filming
The film was shot entirely in Australia with finance from Hollywood. The script, director, cinematographer and star were all imported. The film was shot in late 1968 and early 1969, on location in the small town of Cambewarra, near Nowra and the Shoalhaven River, and in the studio of Ajax Films. There were a number of movies being shot in Australia at the time including Squeeze a Flower and Ned Kelly.

Reception
The film had its world premiere in Canberra in March 1970. Adam's Woman took $15,000 at the box office in Australia. Overseas reaction was not strong.

See also
 List of American films of 1970

References

External links

Adam's Woman at Oz Movies

1970 films
Films directed by Philip Leacock
1970s historical drama films
Films set in New South Wales
Films set in colonial Australia
American historical drama films
Films set in the 1840s
Australian historical drama films
Warner Bros. films
1970 drama films
1970s English-language films
1970s American films